Ivanoe Fraizzoli (2 May 1916 – 8 September 1999) was an Italian entrepreneur and the former owner of Inter Milan from 1968 to 1984.

Life and career
In 1923, his father Leonardo founded the Fabbrica Italiana di Uniformi Civili (in English: "Italian Factory of Civil Uniforms"), a company specialised in workwear and uniforms meant for civil use, which Ivanoe inherited. The company was later renamed to Manifattura Fraizzoli.

In 1960, Fraizzoli became a sporting director at Inter Milan, before purchasing the club from Angelo Moratti in 1968, becoming the club's 16th chairman.

Under his ownership, Inter purchased players such as Evaristo Beccalossi, Alessandro Altobelli, Roberto Boninsegna, and Fulvio Collovati, winning two Scudetto (1970–71 and 1979–80) and two Coppa Italia (1977–78 and 1981–82).

In 1984, he sold the club to Ernesto Pellegrini.

References

1916 births
1999 deaths
Italian football chairmen and investors
Inter Milan chairmen and investors